Prison of the nations is a phrase first used by Vladimir Lenin in 1914. He applied it to Russia, describing the national policy of that time. The idea of calling Russia a prison is based on Marquis de Custine's book La Russie en 1839. 

Engels had used the phrase. It is also associated with Soviet historian Mikhail Pokrovsky's criticism of "Russia—prison of the peoples" and "Russia—international gendarmerie".

The main meaning of the phrase was the general idea of the Russian Empire as a backward authoritarian state. This definition was also sometimes used in relation to other multinational states that suppressed the desire of peoples for self-determination (Austria-Hungary, the Ottoman Empire, the USSR, Yugoslavia and others).

Historiography 
In "Russia as the Prison of Nations" (1930), Pokrovsky wrote that direct coercion was applied most often by the Russian Empire in areas of expansion in the Far East, Caucasus, Central Asia, and Manchuria, as well as in western parts of the empire such as Poland, and "a great many Poles ended their lives in Siberia". Pokrovsky mentioned that Ukrainian, Belarusian, and Georgian schools did not exist and that in Polish schools the speaking of Polish language was penalized by depriving meals. Pokrovsky highlighted the history of the Jews as the most outcast in tsarist rule, due to the Pale of Settlement, restricting where to live. Pokrovsky cited Lenin's idea that "the dictatorship of the serf-holding landowners was not only a reflection of our country’s economic backwardness, it was also one of the causes of this backwardness. As it rested on outmoded forms of economy, it did not let the economy move forward at the same time. As long as it was not overthrown, [the Russian Empire] had to remain a backward agrarian country."

Soviet historians traditionally criticized tsarist policies, which included some usage of the phrase "prison of the peoples" after Lenin. On the other hand, historians have debated how much Stalin was willing to acknowledge the existence of Lenin's and Pokrovsky's "prison of the peoples" idea. The "Observations" were a set of messages sent in August 1934 to Soviet editors providing an official interpretation of history of the USSR, which became public with their publication to state organ Pravda in January 1936. The contents of these "Observations" have sometimes been seen by historians as a Stalinist willingness to acknowledge Lenin's observation. However, historian David Brandenberger disagreed based on the context and time of the original private publications earlier in 1934. In July 1934, Stalin sent a letter to the Soviet Politburo, arguing that Tsarist Russia should not be specifically criticized, because all European countries had been reactionary in the nineteenth century, rather than the Russian Empire alone. In light of Stalin's narrowing of the historiography, Brandenberger argued the important takeaway from "Observations" is not that they included the phrase "tsarism—prison of the peoples", but rather that they replaced the word "Russia" in an earlier turn of phrase with "tsarism" to narrow the target of critique to a form of government. While Stalin used some remaining rubric of internationalism, this shift served a more "pragmatic" interpretation of history, from the Soviet Kremlin's perspective, that began to reuse more elements of nationalism.

In January 1936 another history textbook commission was launched, this chaired by Andrei Zhdanov and including a number of top Communist Party functionaries, including Nikolai Bukharin, Karl Radek, Yakov Yakovlev, and Karl Bauman, among others. In conjunction with the work of this commission, Bukharin authored  a lengthy critique of Pokrovsky and his methodology, accusing the deceased historian of mechanistic adherence to abstract sociological formulas, failure to properly understand and apply the dialectic method, and a tendency to depict history as a crudely universal process. The Zhdanov Commission, in consultation with Stalin, issued an influential communique which categorized historians of the Pokrovsky school as conduits of harmful ideas that were at root "anti-Marxist, anti-Leninist, essentially liquidatorist, and anti-scientific."

Pokrovsky's criticism of the Tsarist old regime as a "prison of peoples" and "international gendarme" was henceforth deemed to be anti-patriotic "national nihilism" and a new Russian nationalist historical orthodoxy was established. This new official orthodoxy remained in place for the duration of Stalin's life.

Some historians evaluating the Soviet Union as a Soviet empire, applied the "prison of nations" idea to the USSR. Thomas Winderl wrote "The USSR became in a certain sense more a prison-house of nations than the old Empire had ever been."

See also 
 Forced settlements in the Soviet Union
 Great Russian chauvinism
 Gulag
 Katorga
 Penal transportation
 Dissolution of Russia

External links 
 Prison of the peoples (Тюрьма́ наро́дов)

Bibliography 
  David Brandenberger, "Politics Projected into the Past: What Precipitated the Anti-Pokrovskii Campaign?" in Ian D. Thatcher (ed.), Reinterpreting Revolutionary Russia: Essays in Honour of James D. White. Houndmills, England: Palgrave, 2006; pp. 202–214.
  Russia as the Prison of Nations M. N. Pokrovskii, Russia as the Prison of Nations. 1930 Original Source: 1905 god (Moscow: OGIZ Moskovskii rabochii, 1930). Reprinted in M. N. Pokrovskii, Izbrannye proizvedeniia (Moscow 1965-67), IV:129-35.

References

Further reading 
 

Russian words and phrases
Politics of the Russian Empire
Politics of the Soviet Union
Imperialism
Russian Empire
Russification
Antisemitism in the Russian Empire
Antisemitism in the Soviet Union
Poland–Russia relations
Partitions of Poland
Vladimir Lenin